, also known as Star Blazers: The Bolar Wars, is a Japanese military science fiction anime series produced by Academy Productions. It is the sequel to Space Battleship Yamato II created by Yoshinobu Nishizaki and Leiji Matsumoto.  It aired on Yomiuri TV in Japan from October 11, 1980 to April 4, 1981.

Plot
The plot centers about the drama which ensues when a stray proton missile, from a battle between the Galman Empire and the Bolar Federation, crashes into the Sun causing nuclear fusion to accelerate to unsafe levels.  The Yamato and crew must then set out on a mission to look for a new world for the human race. They must do so in less than one year.

Over the course of the story, the Yamato and crew must complete their mission of finding a new home for Earthlings amidst the strife caused by the Galman-Bolar conflict.  The Galmans, we learn, are the ancestral race from which the Gamilas came.  After the battle with the Dark Nebula Empire ended, a battle which destroyed the planet Gamilas, Desler and his remaining forces set out to search for this ancestral homeland.  They found Galman, enslaved by the cruel grey-skinned aliens known as the Bolars.  They promptly liberated Galman, and a galaxy-wide war ensued.

The Yamato and crew eventually catch up with Desler, who is deeply remorseful that Earth has been dragged into this conflict.  Desler dispatches a team of Gamilas-Galman scientists to attempt to restore the Sun.  This effort ultimately fails.

During the course of the mission, the Yamato rescues Ruda, the exiled queen of the mysterious and hidden planet, Shalbart.  It turns out that she is worshipped by peace-seeking factions within both the Galman and Bolar empires, and is wanted (preferably dead) by both governments which fear her influence.  This puts a strain on the fragile alliance between Earth and the Galmans, and causes the Bolars to declare outright war against Earth.

Earth is finally saved when the Yamato brings Ruda to Shalbart, and she decides to give the Earthlings a device (the Hydro-Cosmogen Gun) that can restore the Sun's natural fusion balance.  But even this only succeeds after some ultimate sacrifices on the part of some of Yamato's crew.

Cast 

 Noriko Ohara as Sabera
 Kei Tomiyama as Susumu Kodai
 Yōko Asagami as Yuki Mori
 Akira Kamiya as Shirou Katou
 Goro Naya as Gustav
 Eiji Kanie
 Takeshi Aono
 Masatō Ibu    Desler, Heikurō Tōdō
 Kouji Yada     (General Talon)
 Kenichi Ogata  (Analyzer)
 Keiko Han      (Ruda Sharubāto)
 Kazuo Hayashi (Yasuo Nanbu)
 Hirotaka Suzuoki (Kojirou Ohta)
 Hideyuki Tanaka  (Ryuusuke Damon)
 Junpei Takiguchi
 Kaneto Shiozawa
 Kôhei Miyauchi (Shalibart Elder)
 Shigeru Chiba
 Sumi Shimamoto
 Shōzō Iizuka
 Tesshō Genda
 Tohru Furuya as Daisuke Tokugawa
 Tomomichi Nishimura
 Toshio Furukawa as Takeshi Ageha

Notes

References

External links 
 
 
 

1980 anime television series debuts
Animated space adventure television series
Military science fiction television series
Space opera anime and manga
Space Battleship Yamato
Yomiuri Telecasting Corporation original programming